Alloclubionoides is a genus of Asian funnel weavers first circumscribed by K. Y. Paik in 1992.

Species
 it contains thirty-five species:

Alloclubionoides amurensis (Ovtchinnikov, 1999) – Russia (Far East)
Alloclubionoides bifidus (Paik, 1976) – Korea
Alloclubionoides cochlea (Kim, Lee & Kwon, 2007) – Korea
Alloclubionoides coreanus Paik, 1992 – Korea
Alloclubionoides dimidiatus (Paik, 1974) – Korea
Alloclubionoides euini (Paik, 1976) – Korea
Alloclubionoides geumensis Seo, 2014 – Korea
Alloclubionoides grandivulvus (Yaginuma, 1969) – Japan
Alloclubionoides huanren Zhang, Zhu & Wang, 2017 – China
Alloclubionoides hwaseongensis Kim, Yoo & Lee, 2018 – Korea
Alloclubionoides imi Kim, Yoo & Lee, 2018 – Korea
Alloclubionoides jaegeri (Kim, 2007) – Korea
Alloclubionoides jirisanensis Kim, 2009 – Korea
Alloclubionoides kimi (Paik, 1974) – Korea
Alloclubionoides lunatus (Paik, 1976) – Korea
Alloclubionoides mandzhuricus (Ovtchinnikov, 1999) – Russia (Far East)
Alloclubionoides meniscatus (Zhu & Wang, 1991) – China
Alloclubionoides naejangensis Seo, 2014 – Korea
Alloclubionoides namhaensis Seo, 2014 – Korea
Alloclubionoides namhansanensis Kim, Yoo & Lee, 2018 – Korea
Alloclubionoides napolovi (Ovtchinnikov, 1999) – Russia (Far East)
Alloclubionoides nariceus (Zhu & Wang, 1994) – China
Alloclubionoides nasuta Kim, Yoo & Lee, 2018 – Korea
Alloclubionoides ovatus (Paik, 1976) – Korea
Alloclubionoides paiki (Ovtchinnikov, 1999) – Russia (Far East)
Alloclubionoides paikwunensis (Kim & Jung, 1993) – Korea
Alloclubionoides pseudonariceus (Zhang, Zhu & Song, 2007) – China
Alloclubionoides quadrativulvus (Paik, 1974) – Korea
Alloclubionoides rostratus (Song, Zhu, Gao & Guan, 1993) – China
Alloclubionoides solea Kim & Kim, 2012 – Korea
Alloclubionoides terdecimus (Paik, 1978) – Korea
Alloclubionoides triangulatus (Zhang, Zhu & Song, 2007) – China
Alloclubionoides trisaccatus (Zhang, Zhu & Song, 2007) – China
Alloclubionoides wolchulsanensis Kim, 2009 – Korea
Alloclubionoides yangyangensis Seo, 2014 – Korea

References

Further reading

 

Agelenidae
Araneomorphae genera
Spiders of Asia